

Events and publications

January
 Fox Publications goes bankrupt, which means the end of the series The Flame.
 Action Comics (1938 series) #44 - DC Comics
 Adventure Comics (1938 series) #70 - DC Comics
 All-American Comics (1939 series) #34 - DC Comics
 Captain America Comics (1941 series) #10 - Timely Comics
Crack Comics (1940 series) #20 - Quality Comics
 Daring Mystery Comics (1940 series) #8 - final issue, cancelled by Timely Comics
 Detective Comics (1937 series) #59 - DC Comics
 Flash Comics (1940 series) #25 - DC Comics
 Marvel Mystery Comics (1939 series) #27 - Timely Comics
 More Fun Comics (1936 series) #74 - DC Comics
 Sensation Comics #1 (cover date) featuring Wonder Woman — DC Comics
 Star Spangled Comics (1941 series) #4 - DC Comics
 Superman (1939 series) #14 - DC Comics
 U.S.A. Comics (1941 series) #3 - Timely Comics

February

 February 10. In Italy, after the outbreak of the war with USA, Tuffolino, by Federico Petrocchi and Pier Lorenzo De Vita, replaces Topolino (Mickey Mouse), until then the only American comic tolerated by the Fascist censure. The new comic, a shameless plagiarism of the Disney original, with human characters instead of animals, lasts until December 1943.

 Action Comics (1938 series) #45 - DC Comics
 Adventure Comics (1938 series) #71 - DC Comics
 All-American Comics (1939 series) #35 - DC Comics
 All-Star Comics (1940 series) #9 - DC Comics
 Batman (1940 series) #9 - DC Comics
 Captain America Comics (1941 series) #11 - Timely Comics
Crack Comics (1940 series) #21 - Quality Comics
 Detective Comics (1937 series) #60 - DC Comics
 Dime Comics #1 - Leo Bachle reinvents the Canadian national personification Johnny Canuck as a superhero comic.
 Flash Comics (1940 series) #26 - DC Comics
 Jingle Jangle Comics #1 - Eastern Color
 Marvel Mystery Comics (1939 series) #28 - Timely Comics
 More Fun Comics (1936 series) #76 - DC Comics
 Sensation Comics (1942 series) #2 — DC Comics: In this issue the Wonder Woman characters Etta Candy and Doctor Poison make their debut.
 Star Spangled Comics (1941 series) #5 - DC Comics.

March
 March 6: The Captain Marvel villain Ibac makes his debut. 
 March 11: Marten Toonder's Tom Poes story De Zieke Hertog marks the debut of Olivier B. Bommel's faithful butler Joost.
 March 15: The final episode of Tailspin Tommy, at this point drawn by Reynold Brown, is published. .
 The Dutch comics magazine Sjors is banned on Nazi orders. It will reappear after the war in June 1947.
 The final issue of Blue Ribbon Comics is published.
 The final issue of Human Top is published.
 Action Comics (1938 series) #46 - DC Comics
 Adventure Comics (1938 series) #72 - DC Comics
 All-American Comics (1939 series) #36 - DC Comics
All-Winners Comics (1941 series) #4 - Timely Comics
 Captain America Comics (1941 series) #12 - Timely Comics
Crack Comics (1940 series) #22 - Quality Comics
 Detective Comics (1937 series) #61 - DC Comics
 Flash Comics (1940 series) #27 - DC Comics
 Marvel Mystery Comics (1939 series) #29 - Timely Comics
 More Fun Comics (1936 series) #77 - DC Comics
 Sensation Comics (1942 series) #3 — DC Comics
 Star Spangled Comics (1941 series) #6 - DC Comics
 Superman (1939 series) #15 - DC Comics

Spring Issue
 All Flash Quarterly (1941 series) #4 - DC Comics
 Green Lantern Quarterly (1941 series) #3 - DC Comics
 Leading Comics (1941 series) #2 - DC Comics
 World's Finest Comics (1941 series) #5 - DC Comics

April
 April 16: Marten Toonder's Tom Poes story Het Monster-Ei marks the debut of Wammes Waggel.
 April 20: The first episode of Crockett Johnson's Barnaby is published.
 Action Comics (1938 series) #47 - DC Comics
 Adventure Comics (1938 series) #73 - DC Comics
 All-American Comics (1939 series) #37 - DC Comics
 All-Star Comics (1940 series) #10 - DC Comics
 Batman (1940 series) #10 - DC Comics
 Captain America Comics (1941 series) #13 - Timely Comics
 Detective Comics (1937 series) #62 - DC Comics
 Flash Comics (1940 series) #28 - DC Comics
 Human Torch Comics (1940 series) #7 - Timely Comics
 Joker Comics #1 - Timely Comics. In its first issue Basil Wolverton's Powerhouse Pepper makes its debut. The series will run until the spring of 1948.
 Marvel Mystery Comics (1939 series) #30 - Timely Comics
 More Fun Comics (1936 series) #78 - DC Comics
 Red Ryder Comics, with issue #6, taken over from Hawley by Dell Comics.
 Sensation Comics (1942 series) #4 — DC Comics
 Star Spangled Comics (1941 series) #7 - DC Comics
 Sub-Mariner Comics (1941 series) #5 - Timely Comics
Young Allies Comics (1941 series) #3 - Timely Comics

May
 May 15: In the U.S. internment camp for Japanese-Americans, Santa Anita, California at the Assembly Center, Chris Ishii creates the comic strip Li'l Neebo for the prisoners. The series is later continued by, respectively, Tom Okamoto  and Jack Ito until 1944. 
 May 16: The British comics magazine Funny Wonder merges with another magazine Wonder. 
 The final episode of Tailspin Tommy, originally created by Hal Forrest, is published.
 Action Comics (1938 series) #48 - DC Comics
 Adventure Comics (1938 series) #74 - DC Comics
 All-American Comics (1939 series) #38 - DC Comics
 Captain America Comics (1941 series) #14 - Timely Comics
Crack Comics (1940 series) #23 - Quality Comics
 Detective Comics (1937 series) #63 - DC Comics
 Flash Comics (1940 series) #29 - DC Comics
 Marvel Mystery Comics (1939 series) #31 - Timely Comics
 More Fun Comics (1936 series) #79 - DC Comics
 Sensation Comics (1942 series) #5 — DC Comics: In this issue the supervillain Paula von Gunther makes her debut. 
 Star Spangled Comics (1941 series) #8 - DC Comics
 Superman (1939 series) #16 - DC Comics
U.S.A. Comics (1941 series) #4 - Timely Comics

June
 June 11: Hergé's Tintin story The Secret of the Unicorn is prepublished in Le Soir. Halfway the story butler Nestor and the castle of Marlinspike Hall make their debut.
 June 13: The final episode of comic strip The Shadow by Walter B. Gibson and Vernon Greene is published.
 Action Comics (1938 series) #49 - DC Comics
 Adventure Comics (1938 series) #75 - DC Comics
 All-American Comics (1939 series) #39 - DC Comics
 All Star Comics (1940 series) #11 - DC Comics
All-Winners Comics (1941 series) #5 - Timely Comics
 Batman (1940 series) #11 - DC Comics
 Captain America Comics (1941 series) #15 - Timely Comics
 Detective Comics (1937 series) #64 - DC Comics
 Flash Comics (1940 series) #30 - DC Comics
 Marvel Mystery Comics (1939 series) #32 - Timely Comics
 More Fun Comics (1936 series) #80 - DC Comics
 Sensation Comics (1942 series) #6 — DC Comics
 Star Spangled Comics (1941 series) #9 - DC Comics
Sub-Mariner Comics (1941 series) #6 - Timely Comics
 Yank, the Army Weekly #1 - Harvey Comics: In its first issue George Baker's Sad Sack makes its debut.
Young Allies Comics (1941 series) #4 - Timely Comics

Summer Issue
 All Flash Quarterly (1941 series) #5 - DC Comics. In this issue the villain trio Winky, Blinky, and Noddy make their debut. 
 Green Lantern Quarterly (1941 series) #4 - DC Comics
 Leading Comics (1941 series) #3 - DC Comics
 Wonder Woman (1942 series) #1 - DC Comics, which marks the first stand-alone series of William Moulton Marston and Harry G. Peter's Wonder Woman. In its first issue supervillain Ares makes his debut.
 World's Finest Comics (1941 series) #6 - DC Comics

July
 The American comics magazine The Funnies changes its name to New Funnies. 
 Action Comics (1938 series) #50 - DC Comics
 Adventure Comics (1938 series) #76 - DC Comics
 All-American Comics (1939 series) #40 - DC Comics
 Captain America Comics (1941 series) #16 - Timely Comics
Crack Comics (1940 series) #24 - Quality Comics
 Crime Does Not Pay debuts with issue #22, continuing the numbering of Silver Streak Comics — Lev Gleason Publications
 Detective Comics (1937 series) #65 - DC Comics
 Flash Comics (1940 series) #31 - DC Comics
 Human Torch Comics (1940 series) #8 - Timely Comics
 Marvel Mystery Comics (1939 series) #33 - Timely Comics
 More Fun Comics (1936 series) #81 - DC Comics
 Sensation Comics (1942 series) #7 — DC Comics
 Star Spangled Comics (1941 series) #10 - DC Comics
 Superman (1939 series) #17 - DC Comics
 U.S.A. Comics (1941 series) #5 - Timely Comics

August
 In Al Capp's Li'l Abner the comic-within-a-comic Fearless Fosdick makes its debut, though only as a reference. For his first adventure within the series itself readers have to wait until 19 June 1944.
 Action Comics (1938 series) #51 - DC Comics
 Adventure Comics (1938 series) #77 - DC Comics: In this issue Alfred Bester and Stan Kaye's Genius Jones makes its debut. 
 All-American Comics (1939 series) #41 - DC Comics
 All Star Comics (1940 series) #12 - DC Comics
 Batman (1940 series) #12 - DC Comics
 Captain America Comics (1941 series) #17 - Timely Comics
 Detective Comics (1937 series) #66 - DC Comics: In this issue the Batman villain Harvey Dent, better known as Two-Face, makes his debut. 
 Flash Comics (1940 series) #32 - DC Comics
 Marvel Mystery Comics (1939 series) #34 - Timely Comics
 More Fun Comics (1936 series) #82 - DC Comics
 Sensation Comics (1942 series) #8 — DC Comics
 Star Spangled Comics (1941 series) #11 - DC Comics

September
 September 4: In Chester Gould's Dick Tracy the villain Pruneface makes his debut.
 Action Comics (1938 series) #52 - DC Comics
 Adventure Comics (1938 series) #78 - DC Comics
 All-American Comics (1939 series) #42 - DC Comics
All-Winners Comics (1941 series) #6 - Timely Comics
 Captain America Comics (1941 series) #18 - Timely Comics
Crack Comics (1940 series) #25 - Quality Comics
 Detective Comics (1937 series) #67 - DC Comics
 Flash Comics (1940 series) #33 - DC Comics
Human Torch Comics (1940 series) #9 - Timely Comics
 Marvel Mystery Comics (1939 series) #35 - Timely Comics
 More Fun Comics (1936 series) #83 - DC Comics
 Sensation Comics (1942 series) #9 — DC Comics
 Star Spangled Comics (1941 series) #12 - DC Comics
Sub-Mariner Comics (1941 series) #7 - Timely Comics
 Superman (1939 series) #18 - DC Comics
Young Allies Comics (1941 series) #5 - Timely Comics

Fall Issue
 All Flash (1941 series) #6, previously All Flash Quarterly - DC Comics
 Green Lantern Quarterly (1941 series) #5 - DC Comics
 Leading Comics (1941 series) #4 - DC Comics
 Wonder Woman (1942 series) #2 - DC Comics
 World's Finest Comics (1941 series) #7 - DC Comics

October
 October 1: Bob Karp, Carl Barks and Jack Hannah create the first American adventure comics series based on Donald Duck. The series kicks off with the story Donald Duck Finds Pirate Gold.
October 11; Josè Carioca debuts in comics, in a Sunday table by Hubie Karp and Bob Grant.
 In Belgium the Nazis ban the comics magazine Bimbo. 
 Action Comics (1938 series) #53 - DC Comics
 Adventure Comics (1938 series) #79 - DC Comics
 All-American Comics (1939 series) #43 - DC Comics
 All Star Comics (1940 series) #13 - DC Comics
 Batman (1940 series) #13 - DC Comics
 Captain America Comics (1941 series) #19 - Timely Comics
 Detective Comics (1937 series) #68 - DC Comics
 Flash Comics (1940 series) #34 - DC Comics
 Marvel Mystery Comics (1939 series) #36 - Timely Comics
 More Fun Comics (1936 series) #84 - DC Comics
 Sensation Comics (1942 series) #10 — DC Comics
 Star Spangled Comics (1941 series) #13 - DC Comics

November
 Action Comics (1938 series) #54 - DC Comics
 Adventure Comics (1938 series) #80 - DC Comics
Air Fighter Comics (1941 series) #2 - Hillman Periodicals
 All-American Comics (1939 series) #44 - DC Comics
 All-Flash (1941 series) #07, previously quarterly - DC Comics
All-Winners Comics (1941 series) #7 - Timely Comics
Captain America Comics (1941 series) #20 - Timely Comics
Crack Comics (1940 series) #26 - Quality Comics
 Detective Comics (1937 series) #69 - DC Comics
 Flash Comics (1940 series) #35 - DC Comics
 Marvel Mystery Comics (1939 series) #37 - Timely Comics
 More Fun Comics (1936 series) #85 - DC Comics
 Sensation Comics (1942 series) #11 — DC Comics
 Star Spangled Comics (1941 series) #14 - DC Comics
Sub-Mariner Comics (1941 series) #8 - Timely Comics
 Superman (1939 series) #19 - DC Comics

December
 The Swedish comic strip Allan Kämpe by Eugen Semitjov makes its debut.
 Action Comics (1938 series) #55 - DC Comics
 Adventure Comics (1938 series) #81 - DC Comics
 Air Fighters Comics (1941 series) #3 - Hillman Periodicals: In this issue Heap makes his debut.
 All-American Comics (1939 series) #45 - DC Comics
 All Star Comics (1940 series) #14 - DC Comics
 Batman (1940 series) #14 - DC Comics
 Captain America Comics (1941 series) #21 - Timely Comics
 Detective Comics (1937 series) #70 - DC Comics
 Flash Comics (1940 series) #36 - DC Comics
 Marvel Mystery Comics (1939 series) #38 - Timely Comics
 More Fun Comics (1936 series) #86 - DC Comics
 Sensation Comics (1942 series) #12 — DC Comics
 Star Spangled Comics (1941 series) #15 - DC Comics
 U.S.A. Comics (1941 series) #6 - Timely Comics

Winter Issue
 Boy Commandos (1942 series) #1 - DC Comics
 Comic Cavalcade (1942 series) #1 - DC Comics
 Green Lantern Quarterly (1941 series) #6 - DC Comics
 Leading Comics (1941 series) #5 - DC Comics
 World's Finest Comics (1941 series) #8 - DC Comics
 Eugen Semitjov begins publishing Allan Kämpe

Specific date unknown
 The final issue of the Flemish comics magazine Wonderland is published, a supplement to the newspaper De Dag.
 The first episode of Carl Grubert's The Berrys is published. It will run until 1974. 
 Bovil creates his comic strip Tusen Och en Natt, based on Arabian Nights. It will run until his death in 1949.
 Vic Herman creates Winnie the Wac.
 Philip Mendoza draws The Early Life of Winston Churchill, which is the earliest biographical comic about Winston Churchill.
 During the internment of Japanese Americans Bennie Nobori draws the comic strip Yankee Reporter for the prisoners in camp Topaz in Central Utah.
 Joe Simon and Jack Kirby leave Timely Comics and move to National Comics (now DC Comics).
 Ángel Umpierrez launches his gag comic Don Cristóbal.

Births

February
 February 6: Clive Collins, British cartoonist, (d. 2022).

Deaths

April
 April 1: Charles H. Wellington, American comics artist (Pa's (Imported) Son-In-Law), passes away at age 48.

May
 May 12: George William Wakefield, British comics artist (worked for Film Fun, made comics based on Laurel & Hardy), dies from a stroke at age 54. 
 May 14: René Bull, Irish comics illustrator and comics artist, passes away at the age of 79.

July
 July 11: Antonio Salemme, Italian comics artist (Il Principe Azzurro), dies at the age of 48 or 49.
 July 21: Giove Toppi, Italian comics artist (Topo Lino, Renato Gallo), dies at age 53.

August
 August 10: Albert Guillaume, French caricaturist, illustrator and poster designer who also made some occasional pantomime comics, dies at age 69.

September
 September 11: Horst Rosenthal, German-born French comics artist (made a series of text comics while incarcerated in Gurs internment camp, among them a comic strip starring Mickey Mouse named Mickey au Camp de Gurs), is executed in Auschwitz at the age of 27.

November
 November 7: J. Norman Lynd, American comics artist (Family Portraits, continued Vignettes of Life), dies at age 63.
 November 11: Billy DeBeck, American comics artist (Barney Google), dies at the age of 52.
 November 26: Larry Whittington, American comics artist (Fritzi Ritz) dies in a car accident at the age of 39.

Specific date unknown
 Joe Devlin, American comics artist (assisted Rube Goldberg, continued Looy Dot Dope and worked for Quality Comics), dies at an unknown age.
 Emil Reinicke, German comics artist (published in Fliegende Blätter), passes away at age 82 or 83.
 Josiah Walker, aka Jos Walker, British comics artist (Sexton Blake), dies at age 55.

First issues by title
Boy Commandos, cover-dated Winter, published by DC Comics.
 Comic Cavalcade, cover-dated Winter, published by DC Comics
 Hangman Comics, cover-dated Spring, published by MLJ Magazines Inc.
 Sensation Comics, cover-dated January, published by DC Comics.
 Wonder Woman, cover-dated Summer, published by DC Comics.

Initial appearances by character name
Airboy in Air Fighters Comics #2 (November), created by writers Charles Biro and Dick Wood, and artist Al Camy - Hillman Periodicals
Air Wave in Detective Comics #60 (February), created by Murray Boltinoff - DC Comics
Boomerang in More Fun Comics #79 (May) - DC Comics
 Dan the Dyna-Mite in Star Spangled Comics #7 (April), created by Mort Weisinger and Hal Sharp - DC Comics
Dan Turpin in Detective Comics #64 (June), created by Joe Simon and Jack Kirby - DC Comics
Doctor Poison in Sensation Comics #2 (February), created by William Moulton Marston and Harry G. Peter - DC Comics
Etta Candy' in Sensation Comics #2 (February), created by William Moulton Marston and Harry G. Peter - DC Comics
 False-Face in Leading Comics #2 (National Comics, Spring), created by Mort Weisinger and Creig Flessel
 Gay Ghost in Sensation Comics #1 (January), created by Gardner Fox and Howard Purcell - DC Comics
 Guardian in Star Spangled Comics #7 (April), created by Joe Simon and Jack Kirby - DC Comics
Heap in Air Fighters Comics #3 (December), created by Harry Stein and Mort Leav - Hillman Periodicals
Kid Eternity in Hit Comics #25 (December), created by Otto Binder and Sheldon Moldoff - DC Comics
 Liberty Belle in Boy Commandos #1 (December), created by Don Cameron and Chuck Winter - DC Comics
Mary Marvel in Captain Marvel Adventures #18 (December), created by Otto Binder and Marc Swayze - DC Comics
 Metallo in World's Finest Comics #6 (June), created by Robert Bernstein and Al Plastino - DC Comics
 Mister Terrific (Terry Sloane) in Sensation Comics #1 (DC Comics, January), created by Charles Resizenstein and Hal Sharpe
 Paul Kirk, created by Jack Kirby, in Adventure Comics #58 (January), published by DC Comics
 The Prankster in Action Comics #51 (August), created by Jerry Siegel and John Sikela - DC Comics
The Puzzler in Action Comics #49 (June), created by Jerry Siegel and John Sikela - DC Comics
Shade in Flash Comics #33 (September),created by Gardner Fox - DC Comics
 Rag Doll in Flash Comics #36 (December), created by Gardner Fox - DC Comics
 Robotman in Star Spangled Comics #7 (April), created by Jerry Siegel and Leo Nowak - DC Comics
Sal Maroni in Detective Comics #66 (August), created by Bill Finger and Bob Kane - DC Comics
Spider Widow in Feature Comics #57 (June), created by Frank Borth - DC Comics
 TNT in Star Spangled Comics #7 (April), created by Mort Weisinger and Hal Sharp - DC Comics
 Two Face in Detective Comics #66 (August), created by Bill Finger and Bob Kane - DC Comics 
 Wildcat in Sensation Comics #1 (January), created by Bill Finger and Irwin Hasen - DC Comics

References